Conall mac Comgaill was king of Dál Riata from about 558 until 574.

He was a son of Comgall mac Domangairt. It is said that he gave Iona to Saint Columba. The Duan Albanach says that he reigned "without dissension", but there is a report of an expedition by Conall and Colmán Bec mac Diarmato of the Southern Uí Néill to Iardoaman in the Annals of Ulster for 568. The much longer entry in the later and less reliable Annals of the Four Masters reports: "A sea fleet was brought by Colman Beg, son of Diarmaid, son of Fearghus Cerrbheoil, and by Conall, son of Comhgall, chief of Dal Riada, to Sol (Seil) and Ile (Islay), and they carried off many spoils from them."

The Senchus fer n-Alban says that Conall had seven sons: Loingsech, Nechtan, Artan, Tuathan, Tutio and Coirpe. However, Connad Cerr is taken to be a son of Conall, and the death of Conall's son Dúnchad is noted in the Annals of Ulster and the Annals of Tigernach, leading the army of the "sons of Gabrán" in Kintyre.

References

 Anderson, Alan Orr, Early Sources of Scottish History A.D 500–1286, volume 1. Reprinted with corrections. Paul Watkins, Stamford, 1990. 
 Bannerman, John, Studies in the History of Dalriada. Scottish Academic Press, Edinburgh, 1974.

External links
CELT: Corpus of Electronic Texts at University College Cork includes the Annals of Ulster, Tigernach, the Four Masters and Innisfallen, the Chronicon Scotorum, the Lebor Bretnach (which includes the Duan Albanach), Genealogies, and various Saints' Lives. Most are translated into English, or translations are in progress.

6th-century births
574 deaths
Kings of Dál Riata
6th-century Scottish monarchs
6th-century Irish monarchs